Sunparlour Players are a Canadian alternative country band. Based in Toronto, Ontario, the band consists of songwriter Andrew Penner on lead vocals, guitar, bass, banjo, bass organ pedals, percussion, and kick drum and Michael "Rosie" Rosenthal on drums, glockenspiel, banjo, backing vocals, keyboards and bass.  They come from Ontario. Andrew Penner grew up on a farm near Leamington, in the region nicknamed Canada's "Sun Parlour".

The band independently released its debut album Hymns for the Happy in 2006, and rereleased it in 2007 after signing to The Baudelaire Label. Their second album, Wave North, followed in 2009 on Outside Music. Extensive touring has taken place since the release of Wave North, including gigs with Mumford & Sons, Blue Rodeo and Plants and Animals, as well as their own headlining schedule of shows in barns, backyards, theatres, and clubs. On October 18, 2011 they released their latest album Us Little Devils on Outside Music. After Sunparlour Preserves, an EP released in 2012, Sunparlour Players register a new album, The Living Proof, released in April 2014. They start a promotional tour around Canada in spring 2014.

Discography

Albums
 Hymns for the Happy (2007)
 Wave North (2009)
 Us Little Devils (2011)
 The Living Proof (2014)

EP 
 Sunparlour Preserves (2012)

Compilations
 This Beautiful City soundtrack (2008), tracks "Bless this City", "We Want What's Right"
  Jenny Omnichord, Charlotte or Otis - Duets for Children, their parents, and other people too (2008), track "Fences Are High"

References
5. Rockin' the Sunparlour, Metro, November 2006

External links
 Sunparlour Players official website

Musical groups established in 2005
Musical groups from Toronto
Canadian alternative country groups
2005 establishments in Ontario